Ignacio "Nacho" Solozábal (born January 8, 1959) is a Spanish retired professional basketball player. Born in Barcelona, Spain, and at a height of 1.85 m (6'1") tall, played at the point guard position. On October 8, 2006, FC Barcelona retired his number 7 jersey. He is considered to be one of the best Spanish basketball players, and he was among the 105 player nominees for the 50 Greatest EuroLeague Contributors (2008) list.

Professional career
Solozábal spent his entire career with FC Barcelona, from 1979 to 1992. With them he won two Saporta Cups, in 1985 and 1986, a Korać Cup in 1987, six Spanish League championship titles, as well as nine Spanish Cups.

National team career
Solozábal played internationally with the senior Spanish national team, and they won silver medals at the 1983 EuroBasket, and at the 1984 Summer Olympics.

References

External links 
FIBA Europe Profile
Euroleague.net 50 Greatest EuroLeague Contributors - Nominees

1959 births
Living people
Basketball players at the 1980 Summer Olympics
Basketball players at the 1984 Summer Olympics
Basketball players at the 1988 Summer Olympics
Basketball players with retired numbers
FC Barcelona Bàsquet players
Liga ACB players
Medalists at the 1984 Summer Olympics
Olympic basketball players of Spain
Olympic medalists in basketball
Olympic silver medalists for Spain
Point guards
Spanish men's basketball players
1982 FIBA World Championship players
Basketball players from Barcelona
1986 FIBA World Championship players